Ring Around the Bath is a domestic situation comedy series broadcast on BBC Radio 4 between 2003 and 2006. It was written by Lucy Clare and Ian Davidson and produced by Elizabeth Freestone.

Cast
 Duncan Preston as Patrick Bartholomew
 Penny Downie (Series 1 and 2) / Pippa Haywood (Series 3) as Stella Bartholomew
 Claudie Blakley as Alison Bartholomew
 Bruce Mackinnon as Rick Bartholomew
 Daniela Denby-Ashe as Egg Bartholomew
 Catherine Shepherd as Xanthe

Situation
Stella Bartholomew is a middle-aged mother with a job in a garden centre. She hopes her adult children will move out of their chaotic suburban home so she and her husband can retire to the country. Her cookery-expert husband, Patrick, and the children are much less keen on the idea. Oldest daughter Alison is approaching thirty and works as an estate agent. Son Rick is unable to hold down a steady job. Rick's naïve but eager to help girlfriend Xanthe lives with them. The youngest in the family, Egg, is studying for A-levels.

Episodes

Series One

Series Two

Series Three

Broadcast History
Three series of the show have been broadcast, each with six half-hour episodes. The first series was aired in August and September 2003. The show returned for a second series in November and December 2004. The final series was aired in January and February 2006.

Repeat airings have been made on BBC Radio 7 and BBC Radio 4 Extra.

Critical Reaction
The Guardian found it "tightly scripted" and "horribly realistic".

References

External links

Radio listings
Episode listing from epguides.com

BBC Radio comedy programmes
2003 radio programme debuts
BBC Radio 4 programmes